The 2008 French motorcycle Grand Prix was the fifth round of the 2008 MotoGP Championship. It took place on the weekend of 16–18 May 2008 at the Le Mans Bugatti Circuit. It was also the final all-Yamaha podium until the 2014 Australian motorcycle Grand Prix.

MotoGP classification

250 cc classification

125 cc classification
The race was stopped after 14 laps due to rain. It was later restarted for 5 additional laps, with the grid determined by the running order before the suspension. The second part of the race determined the final result.

Championship standings after the race (MotoGP)

Below are the standings for the top five riders and constructors after round five has concluded. 

Riders' Championship standings

Constructors' Championship standings

 Note: Only the top five positions are included for both sets of standings.

References

French motorcycle Grand Prix
French
Motorcycle Grand Prix